PopSister was a Japanese monthly gal-shibuya-kei-oriented fashion magazine published by Kadokawa Publishing & Co. Launched in 2010 as the "older sister" magazine of Popteen, PopSister was targeted at females in their teens and early 20s.

History
The original PopSister, titled Scream, was published in 2009 as a special edition of Popteen magazine.

The first authentic issue of PopSister was published on April 17, 2010. It featured seven exclusive models, Tsubasa Masuwaka, Kana Hoshino, Yui Kanno, Jun Komori, Tomoko Higuchi, Eri Aoki, and Wei Son. The last issue was released in November 2011.

References

External links
Popteen official 

2010 establishments in Japan
2011 disestablishments in Japan
Defunct women's magazines published in Japan
Fashion magazines published in Japan
Gyaru
Kadokawa Shoten magazines
Magazines established in 2010
Magazines disestablished in 2011
Magazines published in Tokyo
Monthly magazines published in Japan
Shibuya-kei